Direct Stream Digital (DSD) is a trademark used by Sony and Philips for their system for digitally encoding audio signals for the Super Audio CD (SACD).

DSD uses pulse-density modulation encoding - a technology to store audio signals on digital storage media which are used for the SACD. Noise shaping occurs by use of the 64-times oversampled signal to reduce noise and distortion caused by the inaccuracy of quantization of the audio signal to a single bit. Therefore, it is a topic of discussion whether it is possible to eliminate distortion in one-bit delta-sigma conversion.

Development
DSD is a method of storing a delta-sigma signal before applying a decimation process that converts the signal to a PCM signal. Delta-sigma conversion was first described by C. C. Cutler in 1954, but was not named as such until a 1962 paper by Inose et al. Decimation did not initially exist, and oversampled data was sent as is. The proposal to decimate oversampled delta-sigma data before converting it into PCM audio was made by D. J. Goodman in 1969.

DSD technology was later developed and commercialized by Sony and Philips, the designers of the audio CD. However, in 2005, Philips later sold its DSD tool division to Sonic Studio.

Major label support
DVD-Audio was endorsed by the Warner Music Group, while the SACD format was endorsed by Sony and Universal Music Group, with an especially high-profile by UMG imprint Virgin Records. Despite this, in 2011, The Warner Premium Sound series of albums was released by Warner Music Group, marking the first time the label released titles in a SACD format, with recording in DSD. The series grew to ten rock and pop albums, with Super Audio CD/CD hybrid discs containing both an SACD layer and a standard CD layer.

Sony did not promote SACD actively in North America, with the result that DVD-Audio gained competitive traction in the market. Elsewhere, such as in Europe or Japan, SACD gained more of a foothold. Examples include the German Stockfisch Records, which releases vinyl editions of albums and DSD-recordings, released as hybrid SACDs.

Independent label use
Many music companies that specialize in Super Audio CD products therefore use DSD encoding. A number of independent record labels have also worked directly with Sony to focus on DSD products or the DSD recording process.

DMP Digital Music Products was an early user of the SACD digital audio format. In 1997 their release Alto by Joe Beck & Ali Ryerson was the first commercial recording captured with Sony's Direct Stream Digital recording technology. The label's Just Jobim by Manfredo Fest in 1998 was the first project captured with the new Meitner DSD conversion technology. In 2000, DMP released the world's first multi-channel SACD—Sacred Feast by Gaudeamus.

The majority of Telarc International Corporation's releases were on (generally hybrid) SACD, and are DSD recordings. Telarc often worked with early audiophile company Soundstream, and re-released many of its original Soundstream recordings in SACD format. Soundstream, which made the first digital recording in the United States, recorded in 16 bit PCM at a sample rate of 50 kHz via its own proprietary digital recorder. This 50 kHz PCM format was converted to DSD for release on Telarc SACD.

The record label Mobile Fidelity had engineers who decided to adopt the Super Audio CD over the DVD-Audio disc as a high resolution digital format after listening tests and technical evaluations. On the label's Hybrid SACD releases, the SACD layer is a direct DSD recording of the analog master tape, while the CD layer is a digital down conversion of the DSD, with Super Bit Mapping applied. Post-2001, CD-only are sourced from DSD, but omit the SACD layer.

In 2007, Blue Coast Records was founded in California for the purpose of recording and releasing music recorded with the DSD format, primarily focusing on jazz and acoustic artists.

On August 28, 2013, the Acoustic Sounds label launched SuperHiRez.com (now defunct), which sold mainstream albums from major record labels that were produced with Direct Stream Digital or PCM audio formats. On September 4, 2013, Acoustic Sounds announced an agreement with Sony Music Entertainment to provide the company's new digital download service with albums that have been produced or remastered in Direct Stream Digital format.

The format is used on albums such as Pop, Songs & Death in 2009, and the remastered The Rolling Stones album Their Satanic Majesties Request in 2002.

Labels that specialize in direct to DSD recording ("Pure DSD"), with no assistance from analog tape or PCM/DSP mixing/effects include Channel Classics, Hunnia and Eudora records.

DSD technique

SACD audio is stored in DSD, which differs from the conventional PCM used by the compact disc or conventional computer audio systems.

A DSD recorder uses delta-sigma modulation. DSD is 1-bit with a 2.8224 MHz sampling rate. The output from a DSD recorder is a bitstream. The long-term average of this signal is proportional to the original signal. DSD uses noise shaping techniques to push quantization noise up to inaudible ultrasonic frequencies. In principle, the retention of the bitstream in DSD lets the SACD player use a basic (one-bit) DAC design with a low-order analog filter. The SACD format can deliver a dynamic range of 120 dB from 20 Hz to 20 kHz and an extended frequency response up to 100 kHz—though most current players list an upper limit of 80–90 kHz.

Most professional audiologists accept that the upper limit of human adult hearing is 20 kHz and that high frequencies are the first to be affected by hearing loss.

The process of creating a DSD signal is conceptually similar to taking a one-bit delta-sigma analog-to-digital (A/D) converter without adding a decimator, which converts the 1-bit bitstream into multi-bit PCM. Instead, the 1-bit signal is recorded directly and, in theory, only requires a lowpass filter to reconstruct the original analog waveform. In reality, it is a little more complex, and the analogy is incomplete in that 1-bit sigma-delta converters are, these days, rather unusual, most modern sigma-delta converters are multi-bit, one reason being that a one-bit signal cannot be dithered properly.

Because it has been extremely difficult to carry out DSP operations (for example performing EQ, balance, panning and other changes in the digital domain) in a one-bit environment, and because of the prevalence of solely PCM studio equipment such as Pro Tools, the vast majority of SACDs—especially rock and contemporary music, which rely on multitrack techniques—are in fact mixed in PCM (or mixed analog and recorded on PCM recorders) and then converted to DSD for SACD mastering.

To address some of these issues, a new studio format has been developed, usually referred to as DSD-wide, which retains the high sample rate of standard DSD, but uses an 8-bit, rather than single-bit digital word length, yet still relies heavily on the noise shaping principle. DSD-wide is PCM with noise shaping—and is sometimes disparagingly referred to as "PCM-narrow"—but has the added benefit of making DSP operations in the studio a great deal more practical. The main difference is that "DSD-wide" still retains 2.8224 MHz sampling frequency while the highest frequency in which PCM is being edited is 384 kHz. The "DSD-wide" signal is down-converted to regular DSD for SACD mastering. As a result of this technique and other developments there are now a few digital audio workstations (DAWs) that operate, or can operate, in the DSD domain, notably Pyramix and some SADiE systems.

Another format for DSD editing is Digital eXtreme Definition (DXD), a PCM format with 24-bit resolution sampled at 352.8 kHz (or alternatively 384 kHz). DXD was initially developed for the Merging Technologies Pyramix workstation and introduced together with their Sphynx 2, AD/DA converter in 2004. This combination meant that it was possible to record and edit directly in DXD, and that the sample only converts to DSD once before publishing to SACD. This offers an advantage to the user as the noise created by converting DSD rises dramatically above 20 kHz, and more noise is added each time a signal is converted back to DSD during editing.

Note that high-resolution PCM (DVD-Audio, HD DVD and Blu-ray Disc) and DSD (SACD) may still technically differ at high frequencies. A reconstruction filter is typically used in PCM decoding systems, much the same way that bandwidth-limiting filters are normally used in PCM encoding systems. Any error or unwanted artifact introduced by such filters typically affects the end-result. A claimed advantage of DSD is that product designers commonly choose to have no filtering, or modest filtering. Instead DSD leads to constant high levels of noise at these frequencies. The dynamic range of DSD decreases quickly at frequencies over 20 kHz due to the use of strong noise shaping techniques that push the noise out of the audio band, resulting in a rising noise floor just above 20 kHz. The dynamic range of PCM, on the other hand, is the same at all frequencies. However, almost all present-day DAC chips employ some kind of sigma-delta conversion of PCM files that results in the same noise spectrum as DSD signals. All SACD players employ an optional low-pass filter set at 50 kHz for compatibility and safety reasons, suitable for situations where amplifiers or loudspeakers cannot deliver an undistorted output if noise above 50 kHz is present in the signal.

Double-rate DSD (DSD128)
Referred to as DSD128 because the sample rate is 128 times that of CD. Since its establishment content creators have started to make 5.6 MHz DSD128 recordings available, such as the audiophile label Opus3. Additionally a 44.1 kHz variant at 5.6448 MHz has been supported by multiple hardware devices such as the exaSound e20 Mk II DAC. The Korg MR-1000 1-bit digital recorder samples at 5.6448 MHz, twice the SACD rate.

Quad-rate DSD (DSD256)
Referred to as DSD256 because the sample rate is 256 times that of CD. The Pyramix Virtual Studio Digital Audio Workstation allows for recording, editing and mastering all DSD formats, being DSD64 (SACD resolution), DSD128 (Double-DSD) and DSD256 (Quad-DSD). A 48 kHz variant of 12.288 MHz has been established. The exaSound e20 DAC was the first commercially available device capable of DSD256 playback at sampling rates of 11.2896/12.288 MHz. The Merging Technologies Horus AD/DA Converter offers sample rates up to 11.2 MHz, or four times the SACD rate.

Octuple-rate DSD (DSD512)
Referred to as DSD512 because the sample rate is 512 times that of CD. It has a sample rate of 22.5792 MHz (512 times that of CD), or alternatively 24.576 MHz (512 times 48 kHz). Hardware such as the Amanero Combo384 DSD output adapter, and exaU2I USB to I²S interface, and software such as JRiver Media Center, foobar2000 with SACD plugin (up to DSD256 only), Roon, HQPlayer and Neutron Music Player are all able to handle DSD files of this advanced sampling rate fully natively.

DSD playback options
Sony developed DSD for SACD, and many disk players support SACD. Since the format is digital, there are other ways to play back a DSD stream; the development of these alternatives has enabled companies to offer high-quality music downloads in DSD.

DSD disc format
Some professional audio recorders (from Korg, Tascam, and others) can record in DSD format. Transferring this signal to a recordable DVD with the appropriate tools, such as the AudioGate software bundled with Korg MR-1/2/1000/2000 recorders, renders a DSD Disc. Such discs can be played back in native DSD only on certain Sony VAIO laptops and PlayStation 3 systems. HQPlayer from February 16, 2011, version 2.6.0 beta includes support for direct/native playback from DSD Interchange File Format (DSDIFF) and DSD stream files (DSF) to ASIO devices with DSD support. Moreover, Sony produces two SACD players, the SCD-XA5400ES and the SCD-XE800, that fully support the DSD-disc format. Only the DSF format is supported. However, since most personal computers have only PCM audio hardware, DSD discs must be transcoded to PCM on the fly with the proper software plug-ins with questionable quality benefits compared to native high resolution PCM sources like DVD or Blu-ray Disc Audio.

In June 2012, Pioneer launched a series of SACD players compatible with DSD-disc. The PD-30 and PD-50.

In January 2013, TEAC announced a DSD-disc compatible player, the PD-501HR.

DSD over USB
An alternative to burning DSD files onto disks for eventual playback is to transfer the (non-encrypted) files from a computer to audio hardware over a digital link such as USB.

The USB audio 2.0 specification defined several formats for the more common PCM approach to digital audio, but did not define a format for DSD.

In 2012, representatives from many companies and others developed a standard to represent and detect DSD audio within PCM frames; the standard, commonly known as "DSD over PCM", or "DoP", is suitable for other digital links that use PCM. The 1.1 revision added protocol support for higher DSD sample rates without requiring an increase the underlying PCM sample rate. Many manufacturers now offer DACs that support DoP.

DSD compatible hardware
"Native DSD" playback definition is somewhat a matter of philosophy. Generally speaking, it avoids the conversion of DSD data into multibit PCM at anywhere along the decoding/reproduction chain, as is common in digital volume control.

Many commercially available DACs now support 'native DSD', featuring off-the-shelf chips from ESS, AKM, Cirrus Logic, or Burr Brown.

Due to the minimalist appeal of 1-bit DSD, and its theoretical simplicity in decoding, there are also commercially available and DIY DACs that specialize in DSD decoding, avoiding the use of off-the-shelf DAC chips. These include RT Audio Design's Pure DSD Converter, and the STAR Pure DSD DAC.

Finally, Ed Meitner and Andreas Koch, who have historical ties with the development of DSD and SACD, have companies that produce DACs. Ed Meitner has affiliation with EMM Labs and Meitner Audio. Andreas Koch is affiliated with Playback Designs.

DSD vs. PCM
There has been much controversy between proponents of DSD and PCM over which encoding system is superior. In 2001, Lipshitz and Vanderkooy stated that one-bit converters, as employed by DSD, are unsuitable for high-end applications due to their high distortion. In 2002, Philips published a paper arguing the contrary. Lipshitz and Vanderkooy's paper was further criticized by Angus. Lipshitz and Vanderkooy responded to the criticisms. Stuart also defined sigma-delta modulation a "totally unsuitable choice" for high resolution digital audio.

Conventional implementation of DSD has an intrinsic high distortion. Distortion can be alleviated to some degree by using multibit DACs. State-of-the-art ADCs are based around sigma-delta modulation designs. Oversampling converters are usually used in linear PCM formats, where the ADC or DAC output is subject to bandlimiting and dithering. Most modern ADC and DAC converters use oversampling and a multi-bit design; in other words, while DSD is a 1-bit format, modern converters internally use a 2-bit to 6-bit format.

Comparisons of DSD and PCM recordings with the same origin, number of channels and similar bandwidth and noise have yielded contradictory results. A 2004 study conducted at the Erich-Thienhaus Institute in Detmold, Germany found that in double-blind tests "hardly any of the subjects could make a reproducible distinction between the two encoding systems." In contrast, a 2014 study conducted at the Tokyo University of the Arts found that listeners could distinguish PCM (192 kHz/24 bits) from either DSD (2.8 MHz) or DSD (5.6 MHz) (but not between the two DSD samplings), preferring the sound of DSD over PCM: "For example, Drums stimulus of DSD (5.6 MHz) has p = 0.001 when compared against PCM (192 kHz/24 bit) in overall preference.
This suggests that DSD version was statistically significantly preferred over the PCM version." These findings are questionable however, because "the two formats were subject to different processing, most notably, different filtering of the low frequency content."

DSD met with relatively little success in the consumer market, even though the SACD was actually more successful than its direct competitor, the PCM-based DVD-Audio. Direct manipulation of recorded DSD data is difficult due to the limited availability of appropriate software. The advent of new high-resolution PCM standards, such as DXD, further restricted its market niche. DSD, however, is still used as an archival format for studio applications and is seen as a possible replacement for analog tapes.

DSD file formats

There are several alternative ways to store DSD encoded audio as files on a computer. One option is to use DSD native file formats that have been specifically for this purpose. Alternatively, DSD can be stored in general purpose audio formats that have been officially adapted to support DSD storage. Finally, DSD audio can be embedded into PCM audio streams that do not have special DSD support. However, a special decoder is needed to recover the DSD stream afterwards.

DSD Interchange File Format

DSD Interchange File Format (DSDIFF) is a native DSD file format developed by Philips between years 2000 and 2004 for storage of DSD recordings. The format supports DST compression of the payload as well as annotations used in Super Audio CD production. A single DSDIFF file may store an entire album as a single audio stream together with markers indicating where to cut the individual tracks for the album. Some parts of the audio content may be left out entirely from the resulting SACD. The embedded metadata format is intended for mastering engineers and not consumers. For example, markers indicating beginning of a new audio track have a text field for storing arbitrary text based information. However, there is no requirement for the text to contain the title of the track. A defacto standard for including ID3 metadata in an unofficial ID3 chunk has later formed as consumers have adopted the format for storing individual tracks of DSD audio. Files containing DSDIFF data would typically use the .dff file suffix. No official media type has been registered for the DSDIFF file format. Freedesktop.org uses the unofficial media types audio/x-dff.

Wideband Single-bit Data

Wideband Single-bit Data (WSD) is a native DSD file format developed by 1-bit Audio Consortium in 2002. The consortium was established by Waseda University, Sharp and Pioneer a year earlier. In 2012 the consortium published an updated 1.1 version of the specification. The WSD header has a field for storing an absolute timestamp in samples since midnight. The timestamp makes it possible to accurately know how much time passed between two recordings made consecutively on the same physical recording device. Korg portable recorders MR-1, MR-2, MR-1000 and MR-2000s support WSD alongside other DSD based formats.

DSD Stream File

DSD Stream File (DSF) is a native DSD file format developed by Sony around year 2005. The format is intended for storing individual tracks of DSD audio and has native support for ID3 metadata inclusion. The format defines a "format ID" field that could presumably be used to indicate DST compression. However, the only identifier defined in the spec is number 0 indicating "DSD raw". Files containing DSF data would typically use the.dsf file suffix. No official media type has been registered for the DSF file format. Freedesktop.org uses the unofficial media types audio/x-dsf.

DSD compatible file formats
DSD compatible file formats support storing DSD encoded audio in addition to audio encoded as PCM.

WavPack is a generic audio storage format supporting various different forms of audio. Compressed DSD audio is also supported by the format. The DSD support was initially introduced with the release of WavPack software suite version 5 in December 2016. Files containing WavPack data would typically use the.wv file suffix. No official media type has been registered for the WavPack file format. Freedesktop.org uses the unofficial media types audio/x-wavpack. Since WavPack supports multiple formats the suffix or mime type alone do not indicate the presence of DSD audio.

DSD embeds in PCM based file formats

In addition to actual DSD file formats, a wire format called DSD Audio over PCM Frames (DoP) is used for embedding DSD into PCM audio streams. DoP makes it possible to circumvent any PCM-only component preventing DSD capable DAC from receiving the raw DSD data required for native DSD playback. While DoP is intended to be a wire protocol used for communication between music player application and a DAC, there exists tools that can embed DoP encoded DSD into FLAC files enabling user to use a non-DSD capable player for DSD playback with their DoP capable DAC. DoP is not backward compatible with PCM. Thus, a DoP stream is likely to sound broken when played back by an unsuspecting PCM-only DAC, while a DoP capable DAC can detect the presence of DSD data, extract it from the PCM and play it back as DSD.

See also
 Audio bit depth
 Digital eXtreme Definition (DXD)
 Direct Stream Transfer (DST)
 Glossary of digital audio
 Super Bit Mapping (SBM)
 Timeline of audio formats

References

External links
 Audio Engineering Society Convention Paper 5396: Why Direct Stream Digital is the best choice as a digital audio format
 Audio Engineering Society Convention Paper 5616: Enhanced Sigma Delta Structures for Super Audio CD Applications
 Audio Engineering Society Convention Paper 5619: The Effect of Idle Tone Structure on Effective Dither in Delta-Sigma Modulation Systems
 Audio Engineering Society Convention Paper 5620: Toward a Better Understanding of 1-Bit Sigma-Delta Modulators - Part 3
 —DSD vs PCM comparison
 DSF and DSD Disc Format specifications by Sony
 'How to create a DSD Disc' guide including DSD plug-in for Windows Media Player
 Multi-channel DSD over USB DSD recording playback over USB software and hardware development kit
 DSD downloads

Audio codecs
Audio storage
Digital audio storage